Ponani Petunia Makhubele-Marilele (née Makhubele; born 1979 or 1980) is a South African politician who has served as a Member of the National Assembly of South Africa since 2021, representing the African National Congress.

References

External links
Profile at Parliament of South Africa

Living people
Year of birth missing (living people)
Tsonga people
People from Limpopo
African National Congress politicians
Members of the National Assembly of South Africa
Women members of the National Assembly of South Africa